Thomas Henry Burke (May 6, 1904 – September 12, 1959) was an American politician who represented Ohio in the United States House of Representatives from 1949 to 1951.

Early life and career 
Burke was born in Toledo, Ohio where he attended St. Patrick's grade school and St. John's College. After his formal education, he served in the United States Navy as a pharmacist's mate 1923–1927 and in the Naval Fleet Reserve 1927–1939. He worked for the Dana 1928–1937 and was an official of United Automobile Workers Union 1938–1948.

Burke was a member of the Ohio House of Representatives in 1941 and 1942. He served as a member of Toledo city council 1944–1948. He was vice mayor of Toledo in 1948.

Congress 
Burke was elected as a Democrat to the Eighty-first Congress (January 3, 1949 – January 3, 1951) but was an unsuccessful candidate for reelection in 1950 to the Eighty-second Congress.

After leaving Congress, he was a labor and manpower adviser in the National Production Authority in 1951. He was an unsuccessful candidate for election in 1952 to the Eighty-third Congress. He moved to Alexandria, Virginia and worked as a legislative representative for the United Automobile Workers' Union.

Death 
He died in Arlington, Virginia and was buried in Arlington National Cemetery.

External links

1904 births
1959 deaths
Politicians from Toledo, Ohio
Burials at Arlington National Cemetery
United Auto Workers people
Democratic Party members of the United States House of Representatives from Ohio
20th-century American politicians